The Coupe de la Ligue Final 1997 was a football match held at Parc des Princes, Paris on 12 April 1997, that saw RC Strasbourg defeat FC Girondins de Bordeaux in a penalty shootout

Match details

External links
Report at LFP official site

Coupe de la Ligue Finals
RC Strasbourg Alsace matches
FC Girondins de Bordeaux matches
Association football penalty shoot-outs
1996–97 in French football
April 1997 sports events in Europe
Football competitions in Paris
1997 in Paris